FLUKA (FLUktuierende KAskade) is a fully integrated Monte Carlo simulation package for the interaction and transport of particles and nuclei in matter.
FLUKA has many applications in particle physics, high energy experimental physics and engineering, shielding, detector and telescope design, cosmic ray studies, dosimetry, medical physics, radiobiology. A recent line of development concerns hadron therapy.

FLUKA software code is used by Epcard, which is a software program for simulating radiation exposure on airline flights.

Comparison with other codes 

MCNPX is slower than FLUKA.

Geant4 is slower than FLUKA.

References

Further reading

External links 
 Official site of FLUKA collaboration
 FLUKA on the CERN bulletin
 Physics software used to fight cancer

Fortran software
Physics software
Monte Carlo molecular modelling software
Science software for Linux
Linux-only proprietary software
CERN software
Monte Carlo particle physics software
Proprietary commercial software for Linux